The New River is a  stream in the White Mountains of New Hampshire in the United States. It is a tributary of the Ellis River, part of the Saco River watershed flowing to the Atlantic Ocean in Maine. The river is within the townships of Sargent's Purchase and Pinkham's Grant in Coos County.

The New River rises in the Gulf of Slides, a small glacial cirque at the foot of Boott Spur, a southern extension of Mount Washington. Flowing northeast, the stream drops rapidly down the western slopes of Pinkham Notch, joining the Ellis River in the floor of the notch at the Route 16 crossing, just south of the notch's height of land.

See also

List of rivers of New Hampshire

References

Rivers of New Hampshire
Rivers of Coös County, New Hampshire
Saco River
White Mountains (New Hampshire)
Mount Washington (New Hampshire)